Liceo Joaquin Suarez was the first public secondary school in Pocitos, in the city of Montevideo. 
From 1944 to 1948 its location was in Magallanes street where he shared the building with the Italian School, a place that later the Faculty of Economics and Faculty of Humanities later. That same year, Professor Juan Carlos Sábat Pébet, writer, journalist, historical researcher and poet, (elected director Joaquín Suárez 1945), is the driving force behind the transfer of this high school to the district Pocitos, Spain 2772 Boulevard street.
Later he moved to the street Jaime Zudañez 2730.

External links 
Consejo de Educacion Secundaria (CES)
United Nations Educational, Scientific and Cultural Educations Organization (UNESCO)

Education in Montevideo
Schools in Uruguay
Buildings and structures in Montevideo
Pocitos, Montevideo
1944 establishments in Uruguay
Educational institutions established in 1944